Rajbandh is a village in the Kanksa CD block in the Durgapur subdivision of the Paschim Bardhaman district in the state of West Bengal, India.

Geography

Location
It is about 10 km from Durgapur.

Urbanisation
According to the 2011 census, 79.22% of the population of the Durgapur subdivision was urban and 20.78% was rural. The sole municipal corporation in the Durgapur subdivision is located at Durgapur and the subdivision has 38 (+1 partly) census towns (partly presented in the map alongside; all places marked on the map are linked in the full-screen map).

Economy
Indian Oil Corporation has a terminal and storage depot at Rajbandh. The 270 km Haldia-Mourigram-Rajbandh pipeline of Indian Oil Corporation, commissioned in 1972-74, transports petroleum products from Haldia refinery.

Hindustan Petroleum and Bharat Petroleum have depots at Rajbandh. Bharat Petroleum has a LPG bottling plant at Rajbandh.

Transport
There is a rail station at Rajbandh on the Bardhaman-Asansol section, which is a part of Howrah-Gaya-Delhi line, Howrah-Allahabad-Mumbai line and Howrah-Delhi main line.

National Highway 19 (old numbering NH 2)/ Grand Trunk Road passes through Rajbandh.

Education
Durgapur Institute of Advanced Technology and Management was established at Rajbandh in 2002. It is affiliated with Maulana Abul Kalam Azad University of Technology.

Durgapur College of Commerce and Science was established in 2003 at Rajbandh.

Gouri Devi Institute of Medical Sciences is a medical college with a 300-bedded multi-speciality health care venture, started in 2017 at Rajbandh. The hospital was established in 2012.

References

Villages in Paschim Bardhaman district